Hochfelden may refer to:
 Hochfelden, Bas-Rhin, France
 Hochfelden, Switzerland